Resorte (Spanish for "spring device") is a Mexican nu metal band formed in 1995.

Biography 
Tavo, Juan Chávez and Carlos Sánchez formed the group in 1995. The band's birth occurred in sync with the emergence of the nu metal genre, which groups such as Rage Against the Machine and KoRn had already been promoting in the U.S. That same year, Resorte made an independent music video for "America" that was the band's first achievement and would become the band's anthem. This video fell into the hands of MTV and began receiving cable play,  which enabled the group to be known.

After many concerts, in June 1997, Resorte released República de Ciegos thru Discos Manicomio. These were moments of gestation for the musical movement that came in that spring. There had been a musical explosion in Mexico, and the band's compatriots Molotov released their first album a month later.

Resorte participated in festivals and multiple concerts for thousands of people. In September 1999, the group released their second album XL. Its release represented a new push for the band and it was then when Resorte got its first taste of real fame, receiving radio and television play and reaching the Top 10 on MTV. By then they were opening concerts for internationally known bands such as Limp Bizkit and Papa Roach.

Resorte took a short break in 2001 to work on new material eventually to become Versión 3.0. Carlos "Charal" Sánchez, the band's drummer and co-founder, had already left the band to be with his family. The label Manicomio shut down operations and Resorte was forced to find another recording label.

Resorte eventually signed with Warner Bros. to release its third album, Rebota (f=k x) in 2002, with the addition of a new vocalist, "Pato" Elizalde, a member of the hip hop group Control Machete. This work represented Resorte's peak in musical quality, having been recorded in two major studios in the U.S. "Pato" returned to his previous group Control Machete after record sales were not as high as expected.

In May 2006, Resorte performed in the Vive Latino festival and in November in Corona Music Fest. In late 2007, Tavo participated in the song "Chinga los Racistas" of the Mexican hip-hop group Cartel de Santa and was a special guest on the third album of Argentinian rapcore band Timmy O' Tool.

Cristian Machado, vocalist of Ill Niño, said: "One of my biggest influences are the two Resorte's vocalists, who are like the Mexican Rage Against the Machine".

In 2009, Resorte were chosen as the opening act for Metallica shows in Mexico City at the Foro Sol and for Avenged Sevenfold in the World Magnetic Tour '09.

After intermittent activity, Resorte released their new single "Re-conecta2" in September 2014, released through all major digital platforms.

In May 2020, founding member Gustavo Limogni died in his sleep of a heart attack at age 52.

Members

Current members
 Gustavo Tavo Limongi (guitar and vocals)  1995–2020
 Juan Chávez (bass and vocals) / 1995–present
 Carlos Charal Sánchez (drums) / 1995–1999, 2007–present
 Gabriel Queso Bronfman (bass) / 1999–2001, 2007–present y juan DE Ruben

Discography

Albums 
 República de Ciegos (1997)
 XL (1999)
 Rebota (f=k x) (2002)

EPs 
 Versión 3.0 (2000)

External links 
Rebota
Web
 

Rapcore groups
Nu metal musical groups
Mexican heavy metal musical groups